Harrison Township is one of fourteen townships in Dearborn County, Indiana. As of the 2010 census, its population was 3,204 and it contained 1,338 housing units.

History
Harrison Township was organized in 1844.

Geography

Cities and towns
 Bright (northeast quarter)
 West Harrison

Unincorporated towns
 Braysville

Major highways
  Interstate 74
  U.S. Route 52
  Indiana State Road 46

Cemeteries
The township contains two cemeteries: Braysville and Harrison Hills.

References
 
 United States Census Bureau cartographic boundary files

External links

 Indiana Township Association
 United Township Association of Indiana

Townships in Dearborn County, Indiana
Townships in Indiana
1844 establishments in Indiana
Populated places established in 1844